The 1985 IBF World Championships (World Badminton Championships) were held in Calgary, Canada, from June 10 to June 16, 1985.

Host city selection
Canada was selected over India and Netherlands by IBF during a meeting in May 1983.

Venue
Pengrowth Saddledome

Medalists

Medal table

Events

References

External links
Badminton.de: Men's singles draw

 
BWF World Championships
Sports competitions in Calgary
Badminton World Championships
International sports competitions hosted by Canada
Badminton tournaments in Canada
IBF World Championships
IBF World Championships
20th century in Calgary